The men's tournament in volleyball at the 1992 Summer Olympics was the 8th edition of the event at the Summer Olympics, organized by the world's governing body, the FIVB in conjunction with the IOC. It was held in Barcelona, Spain from 26 July to 9 August 1992.

Qualification

Pools composition

Rosters

Venues

Preliminary round

Pool A

|}

|}

Pool B

|}

|}

Final round

11th–12th places

11th place match

|}

9th–10th places

9th place match

|}

Final eight

Quarterfinals

|}

5th–8th semifinals

|}

Semifinals

|}

7th place match

|}

5th place match

|}

Bronze medal match

|}

Gold medal match

|}

Final standing

Medalists

Awards

Most Valuable Player
 Marcelo Negrão
Best Spiker
 Marcelo Negrão
Best Blocker
 Ruslan Olikhver
Best Server
 Ron Zwerver

Best Digger
 Scott Fortune
Best Setter
 Maurício Lima
Best Receiver
 Bob Ctvrtlik

References

External links
Final Standing (1964–2000)
Results at Todor66.com

1992 in volleyball
Volleyball at the 1992 Summer Olympics
Men's events at the 1992 Summer Olympics